This is a list of episodes of the satirical British sitcom Drop the Dead Donkey (1990–1998). It was created by Andy Hamilton and Guy Jenkin, with most of the episodes written by them. The colour of each of the tables represents the colour of the series DVD.
The series was set in the newsroom of a news TV station, and hence had to be topical. The character plots for each episode were written in advance, and delivered to the cast on the Monday before recording. The scripts would then be re-written to add in topical references over the next few days. The 'completed' episode would then be recorded on the night before transmission, with some of the cast recording voice-over additions the next day, a few hours before transmission.

Series overview

Episodes

Pilot

Series 1 (1990)

Series 2 (1991)

Series 3 (1993)

Series 4 (1994)

Series 5 (1996)

Series 6 (1998)

Notes

External links

Lists of British sitcom episodes